V. flavescens may refer to:

 Varanus flavescens, a monitor lizard
 Vesperugo flavescens, a vesper bat
 Volana flavescens, an owlet moth